Acromyrmex aspersus is a species of New World ant of the subfamily Myrmicinae found in the wild naturally in southern Brazil and Peru.  Commonly known as "leaf-cutter ants", they are a species of ant from one of the two genera of advanced fungus-growing ants within the tribe Attini.

Subspecies
Acromyrmex aspersus contains these subspecies:
A. a. aspersus F. Smith, 1858
A. a. fuhrmanni  Forel, 1914

References

Acromyrmex
Hymenoptera of South America
Insects described in 1858